Roger White may refer to:

Roger White (politician) (1928–2000), British Tory MP
Roger J. White (1942–2012), American Episcopal bishop of Milwaukee
Roger White (executive) (fl. 2002–present), Scottish soft drinks CEO
Roger White (cricketer) (born 1943), English cricketer
Roger White (luger) (born 1965), Australian Olympic luger
Roger Bourke White (1911–2002), Cleveland businessman

See also
 Roger White-Parsons (born 1960), New Zealand rower